{{Speciesbox
|image = 
|image_caption = 
|genus = Herniaria
|species = maritima
|authority = Link
|status = LC
|status_system = IUCN3.1
|status_ref = 
|status2 = LC
|status2_system = IUCN3.1
|status2_ref = <ref name=iucn>{{Cite iucn |title=Herniaria maritima' |author=Caldas, F.B. |name-list-style=amp |page=e.T161875A5507840 |date=2011 |doi=10.2305/IUCN.UK.2011-1.RLTS.T161875A5507840.en |access-date=6 April 2021}}</ref>
|synonyms = 
|synonyms_ref = 
}}Herniaria maritima'' is a species of flowering plant in the family Caryophyllaceae, endemic to coastal Portugal. It inhabits coastal dunes, mainly in clearings of creeping forests and Junipers in fixed dunes, on sandy, neutral or basic substrates.

References

maritima
Endemic flora of Portugal
Endemic flora of the Iberian Peninsula
Plants described in 1799